Transtillaspis mecosacculus is a species of moth of the family Tortricidae. It is found in Loja Province, Ecuador.

The wingspan is 24 mm. The ground colour of the forewings is brownish, in the basal half mixed with ferruginous where it is suffused and strigulated (finely streaked) with brownish. The markings are brown. The hindwings are whitish cream, mixed with ochreous and strigulated with greyish brown in the apex area.

Etymology
The species name refers to the long sacculus and is derived from Greek  (meaning length).

References

Moths described in 2005
Transtillaspis
Moths of South America
Taxa named by Józef Razowski